Natalia Bajor (born 7 March 1997) is a Polish table tennis player. She competed in the women's team event at the 2020 Summer Olympics.

References

External links
 

1997 births
Living people
Polish female table tennis players
Olympic table tennis players of Poland
Table tennis players at the 2020 Summer Olympics
Place of birth missing (living people)
Table tennis players at the 2014 Summer Youth Olympics